Frixos Grivas (born 23 September 2000) is a Greek professional footballer who plays as an attacking midfielder for Super League club OFI.

Career
On 3 August 2020, Grivas signed a four-year contract with OFI.

Career statistics

Club

References

2000 births
Living people
Greek footballers
Super League Greece players
Super League Greece 2 players
Panionios F.C. players
Kalamata F.C. players
OFI Crete F.C. players
Association football midfielders
Footballers from Livadeia